The Mission Mountain Railroad  is a shortline railroad in northwestern Montana, operating two segments of the former Great Northern Railway (later Burlington Northern and BNSF) since December 2004. MMT is a subsidiary of Watco, operator of several other shortline railroads.

Southern segment

The 14 miles from Columbia Falls to Kalispell, Montana were originally part of the Great Northern's transcontinental main line. The main line was rerouted via Whitefish and Eureka in 1904, avoiding the grades of Haskell Pass west of Kalispell. Farther west and south of Kalispell, the former track toward Marion and Somers has become the Great Northern Historical Trail.

MMT serves several lumber facilities and a grain elevator in Kalispell. The city of Kalispell is currently seeking to relocate the railroad to a new industrial park just north of town and remove the remaining downtown trackage: 2.4 miles of the original route may be abandoned as early as the summer of 2017.

As of April 1, 2020, BNSF has retaken control of the Kalispell Branch.

Northern segment

MMT also operates 26 miles of track between Stryker, Trego, Fortine, and Eureka, Montana. From 1904 to 1970, this segment was part of the Great Northern main line, but became an isolated branch when the Libby Dam and the Flathead Tunnel were built. The main business on this segment is bulk lumber to and from Eureka. A new source of business in 2016 was transloading magnetite ore destined for coal mines in southeastern British Columbia onto trucks at Fortine.

Rolling stock

MMT uses a variety of equipment formerly used on other Watco shortlines. Some of the equipment has been repainted for MMT; other units remain in their original Union Pacific and Milwaukee Road paint. A  locomotive roster is hosted by TrainWeb.

External links
  MMT corporate website

References

Montana railroads
Watco